H.B. Claflin & Company was a Manhattan-based dry goods business which was incorporated in 1890. The company acted as
wholesalers who were middlemen between manufacturers and retailers of dry goods.  The corporation became insolvent in June 1914, with a
debt of $34,000,000. Judge Learned Hand of the United States District Court in New York appointed receivers for the firm on June 25, 1914. The trade of the wholesaler was negatively affected by the migration of the dry goods industry to uptown Manhattan and a failure to adapt to the changing business landscape.

History

Background and early years

H.B. Claflin & Company began operations in 1843, many years before its official incorporation. In 1868 the company retained the same principal leaders from its start, namely Horace Brigham Claflin, E.E. Eames, and E.W. Bancroft. The main building of the business fronted Church Street (Manhattan) for one hundred feet and extended along Worth Street for another four hundred feet. It continued along West Broadway (Manhattan) for one hundred feet. All of its buildings occupied an area encompassing  in 1868. It employed 700
people full-time and up to 1,000 persons during the busiest seasons. The various departments of H.B. Claflin & Company dealt in lace goods, white goods, flannels, blankets, hosiery, shirts, underwear, shawls, hoods, scarves, and gloves.

Later years
In 1914 the Claflin stores in New York were C.G. Gunther's Sons, Lord & Taylor, James McCreery & Company, O'Neill Adams Company, H. Batterman Company, Brooklyn, and the Bedford Company, Brooklyn. Claflin interests controlled an additional thirty stores located in various parts of the United States.

References

External links

American companies established in 1843
Defunct companies based in New York City
History of New York City
1843 establishments in New York (state)
1914 disestablishments in New York (state)
American companies disestablished in 1914